Augusta Mary Anne Holmès (16 December 1847 – 28 January 1903) was a French composer of Irish descent (her father was from Youghal, Co. Cork). In 1871, Holmès became a French citizen and added the accent to her last name. She wrote the texts to almost all of her vocal music herself, including songs, oratorios, the libretto of her opera La Montagne noire and the programmatic poems for her symphonic poems including Irlande and Andromède.

Biography
Holmès was born in Paris, the only child of Irishman Charles William Scott Dalkeith Holmes (17 July 1797 - 19 December 1869) and to Tryphina Anna Constance Augusta Shearer (1811–1858). The poet Alfred de Vigny, who was her godfather, was rumored to be her natural father.

Despite showing talent at the piano, she was not allowed to study at the Paris Conservatoire, but took lessons privately. She developed her piano playing under the tutelage of local pianist Mademoiselle Peyronnet, the organist of Versailles Cathedral Henri Lambert, and Hyacinthe Klosé. Also, she showed some of her earlier compositions to Franz Liszt. Around 1876, she became a pupil of César Franck, whom she considered her real master. (She led the group of Franck's students who in 1891 commissioned for Franck's tomb a bronze medallion from Auguste Rodin.)

Camille Saint-Saëns wrote of Holmès in the journal Harmonie et Mélodie: "Like children, women have no idea of obstacles, and their willpower breaks all barriers. Mademoiselle Holmès is a woman, an extremist." Like other female composers from the nineteenth century including Fanny Mendelssohn and Clara Schumann, Holmès published some of her earlier works under a male pseudonym ("Hermann Zenta") because women in European society at that time were not taken seriously as artists and were discouraged from publishing.

For the 1889 celebration of the centennial of the French Revolution, Holmès was commissioned to write the Ode triomphale for the Exposition Universelle, a work requiring about 1,200 musicians. She gained a reputation of being a composer of programme music with political meaning, such as her symphonic poems Irlande and Pologne.

Musical style
Holmès’ oeuvre is made up of cantatas, symphonic poems, operas, a few works for solo piano and over 100 songs.

First hearing Wagner’s work at the age of 13, Holmès was influenced by Wagner all her life and advocated to have his works performed in the Concerts Populaires, a formidable concert series in Paris. Many parallels can be found in the music of Holmès and Wagner. One of the most direct examples of stylistic likeness can be heard in Wagner’s Ride of the Valkyries from Die Walküre (1856) and Holmès’ Roland furieux (1876). Both works make use of chromaticism and use similar orchestral colour, with dominant brass sections, announcing strong, rhythmically catching, melodic motives, while the strings drive the music forward with rapid, galloping patterns underneath the melody.

Holmès wrote four operas, largely inspired by Wagner, however, La Montagne Noire, staged in 1895, was the only one to be performed. It was one of the few operas written by a woman to be produced at the Paris Opéra in the nineteenth century, but it was poorly received, possibly due to its outdated Wagnerian influences.

The gender rhetoric of the nineteenth century, which prescribed that female composers should limit themselves to smaller, feminine genres, had an impact on the reception towards the music of Holmès. Although praised for her creative gifts, she, like many other female composers of her time, was criticised for crossing the boundary into styles which were thought of as masculine territory. Saint-Saëns, in a review of Holmès’ symphonic poem, Les Argonautes, remarked on her "excessive virility – a frequent fault with women composers – and flamboyant orchestration in which the brass explodes like fireworks...”

Personal life

Holmès never married, but she cohabited with the poet Catulle Mendès; the couple had five children, including:
 Huguette Mendès (1871–1964)
 Claudine Mendès (1876–1937)
 Helyonne Mendès (1879–1955)
Holmès bequeathed most of her musical manuscripts to the Paris Conservatoire.

Selected compositions

Operas
 Héro et Leandre (1875) opera in one act
 Lancelot du lac, opera in three acts (unpublished)
 La Montagne noire, opera in four acts (1885), Paris, Opéra, 8 February 1895

Cantatas
 Astarté, poème musical (1871, unpublished)
 Lutèce, symphonie dramatique (1877)
 Les Argonautes, symphonie dramatique (1880)
 Ludus pro patria, ode-symphonie (1888)
 Au pays bleu, suite symphonique (c.1888)
 Une Vision de Sainte Thérèse for soprano and orchestra (c.1888)
 Ode triomphale en l'honneur du centenaire de 1789 (1889)
 Hymne à la paix (1890)
 Hymne à Apollo (c.1890s) 
 La Belle au bois dormant suite lyrique (1902)
 La Vision de la reine, cantata

Orchestral works
 Ouverture pour une comédie, symphonic poem (before 1870)
 Roland furieux (1876)
 Irlande, symphonic poem (1882)
 Andromède, symphonic poem (1883)
 Pologne, symphonic poem (1883)
 La Nuit et l'amour (1888)

Chamber music
 Minuetto, for string quartet (1867)
 Trois petites pièces for flute and piano (1879)
 Fantaisie in C minor, for clarinet and piano (1900)
 Molto lento, for clarinet and piano

Piano music
 Rêverie tzigane (1887)
 Ce qu'on entendit dans la nuit de Noël (1890)
 Ciseau d'hiver (1892)

Songs, song collections
(selective list)
 Les Sept ivresses: 1. L'Amour; 2. Le Vin; 3. La Gloire; 4. La Haine; 5. Le Rêve; 6. Le Désir; 7. L'Or (1882)
 Trois Chansons populaires: 1. Mignonne; 2. Les Trois pages; 3. La Princesse (1883)
 Noël: Trois anges sont venus ce soir (1884)

 En Chemin (1886)
 Hymne à Eros (1886)
 Fleur de neige (1887)
 La Chanson de gas d'Irlande (1891)
 Berceuse (1892)
 Contes divines (1892–5): 1. L'Aubepine de Saint Patrick (1892); 2. Les Lys bleus (1892); 3. Le Chemin de ciel (1893); 4. La Belle Madeleine (1893); 5. La Légende de Saint Amour (1893); 6. Les Moutons des anges (1895)
 Noël d'Irlande (1896)

References

Bibliography
 Rollo Myers: "Augusta Holmès: A Meteoric Career", in: The Musical Quarterly 53 (1967) 3, pp. 365–76
 Gérard Geffen: Augusta Holmès, l'outrancière (Paris: P. Belfond, 1987), 
 Karen Henson: "In the House of Disillusion: Augusta Holmès and La Montagne noir", in: Cambridge Opera Journal 9 (1997) 3, pp. 232–62
 Michèle Friang: Augusta Holmès ou la gloire interdite (Paris: Éditions Autrement, 2003), 
 Mariateresa Storino: "Chère Illustre": Franz Liszt ad Augusta Holmès, in: "Quaderni dell'Istituto Liszt" 9 (2010), pp. 1–44
 M. Storino: Franz Liszt and Augusta Holmès: Portrait of a Musical Friendship, in: Liszt et la France, ed. by Malou Haine and Nicolas Dufetel (Paris: Vrin, 2012), pp. 263–274; 
 Nicole K. Strohmann: Gattung, Geschlecht und Gesellschaft im Frankreich des ausgehenden 19. Jahrhunderts: Studien zur Dichterkomponistin Augusta Holmès (Hildesheim: Georg Olms, 2012), 
 M. Storino: Solidarietà dei Popoli e idea di Patria: i poemi sinfonici di Augusta Holmès, in: Music and War in Europe from French Revolution to WWI, ed. by Etienne Jardin (Turnhout: Brepols, 2016), pp. 357–377;

External links
 
 Free digital scores by Augusta Holmès in the OpenScore Lieder Corpus
 Holmes and Duparc: A tale of two composers. BBC Radio 3 Composer of the Week, 6–10 July 2020

1847 births
1903 deaths
19th-century classical composers
19th-century French composers
19th-century women composers
20th-century classical composers
20th-century French composers
20th-century French women musicians
20th-century women composers
Burials at the Cemetery of Saint-Louis, Versailles
French opera composers
French people of Irish descent
French Romantic composers
French women classical composers
Irish classical composers
Irish women classical composers
Musicians from Paris
Pseudonyms
Pupils of César Franck
Women opera composers